Sant Gervasi – la Bonanova is a neighbourhood in the Sarrià-Sant Gervasi district of Barcelona, Catalonia (Spain). Formerly it was with the neighbourhood of Sant Gervasi - Galvany, an independent municipality called Sant Gervasi de Cassoles.

The neighbourhood is divided mainly into two distinct sectors: the area of Sant Gervasi, where it houses the oldest nucleus of the town of Sant Gervasi de Cassoles, and another sector, that of la Bonanova, born when it was built the road connecting Sarrià with Sant Gervasi.

The maternelle (preschool) campus of the Lycée Français de Barcelone, the French international school of Barcelona, is in Bonanova.

References

Neighbourhoods of Barcelona
Sarrià-Sant Gervasi